Nicolas Ribonnier ( 1525 – 1605) was a 16th-century French architect.

Biography 
Ribonnier was probably from Langres but no documents were found to confirm it. A Jean Ribonnier priest of Heuilley-le-Grand has been found. If he was from his family, his Langrois origin would be fortified.

If he worked on the rood screen of the cathédrale Saint-Mammès de Langres, this implies that he lived in Langres around 1550. He is quoted as godfather in an act of the parish of Saint-Pierre de Langres, on 18 January 1560.

In a royal letter of 1564 registered at the Chamber of Accounts of Dijon, it is written Nicolas Ribonier, maçon en nostre ville de Dijon is endowed with the office of visiteur des ouvrages des places fortes, villes et chasteaulx de notre pays de Bourgogne, a position vacant following the death of Jean de Vaulx.

Between 1560 and 1605, his name appears several times in the inventory of the municipal archives of Langres. He was not a member of the City Body, but before 1572 he was a member of the Confrérie du Saint-Sacrement. He was also a member of the brotherhood of Saint-Pierre and Saint-Paul in 1604. It is in the register of this brotherhood that we learn the year of his death: 1605.
 in 1588, he traced the boulevard de Longe-Porte,
 in December 1590, he was paid for work done at Porte Neufve,
 In March 1591, he made a commitment to the mayor and aldermen to build a drawbridge at the Market gate and to dig a ditch to avoid surprises,
 in October, he fixed the Moulins' gate,
 In 1594, he rebuilt a wall between the gate of Longe-Porte and the Saint-Gengoul tower, and built a half-moon platform behind the Saint-Ferjeux tower,
 in 1596, he repaired the entire city walls,

He married Jeanne de Voisines and had seven children. His wife belonged to a well-established family in Langres. We know a Jean de Voisines, secretary of the bishopric, then canon from 1555 to 1563. In 1563, a Nicolas de Voisines appears as a mason on a register of the brotherhood of Saint-Pierre and Saint-Paul. Another Jean de Voisines, master builder, commanded the artillery of the Langrois at the siege of Choiseul.

He is qualified as master general of the works of the Duchy of Burgundy in 1570, magister lathomus, master mason in 1587, master architect at the Court of Accounts of the Duchy of Burgundy in 1591, architect in 1593.

On May 16, 1593, the corporation of the masons of Langres, of which Nicolas Ribonnier was a member, modified its statutes, allowing it to become a nursery of architects.

Residing in Dijon in 1564, he also worked with Hugues Sambin at the Dijon courthouse. He made the porch of the Dijon courthouse which precedes the gabled facade.

In 1563, Gaspard de Saulx-Tavannes undertook to build a new castle within the walls of the old  located two leagues from Langres, while retaining the keep. Nicolas Ribonnier, qualified as architect of the Duchy of Burgundy, is considered as the probable architect of this new castle. The sculptors used to make the castle, were probably Italian sculptors who had been called by the cardinal de Givry.

After the construction of the Château du Pailly, Gaspard de Saulx asked Ribonnier in 1573 for plans to rebuild the Château de Sully. Gaspard du Saulx died shortly after designing the plans with his architect. They were executed by his wife, Françoise de La Baume-Montrevel.

In his thesis, Benoît Peaucelle wrote about the château de Pailly:

References

Bibliography 
 Nicolas Ribonnier et l'Architecture à Langres au XVIe siècle, in Louis-Emmanuel Marcel, Le cardinal de Givry, évêque de Langres (1529–1561), volume 2, La Renaissance,  Read online
 Château du Pailly, in Eugène Rouyer, Alfred Darcel, L'art architectural en France depuis François Ier jusqu'à Louis XIV. Motifs de décoration intérieure et extérieure, Noblet et Baudry libraires-éditeurs, Paris, 1863, volume 1, planches 36 and 37  Read online
 Nicolas Ribonnier, in Bulletin de la Société historique et archéologique de Langres, volume 10, No 134, April 1933,  Read online
 Louis-Emmanuel Marcel, Louis-François Marcel, Artistes et Ouvriers d'Art à Langres avant la Révolution, imprimerie Champenoise, Langres, 1935; 84 p.
 Benoît Peaucelle, Le château du Pailly, près de Langres (1563-1573), Thesis in Art History from Paris-Sorbonne University, 4 volumes, 1984 compte-rendu
 Jean-Pierre Jacquemart, Architectures comtoises de la Renaissance, 1525-1636, Presses Universitaires de Franche-Comté, Besançon, 2007,   aperçu

See also 
 Château du Pailly
 Château de Sully

External links 

People from Langres
1520s births
Year of birth uncertain
1605 deaths
16th-century French architects
Renaissance architects